Shanklin Village, also known as the Shanklin Estate or Shanklin Village Estate is a council housing estate in Sutton, South London, sited between Brighton Road and the Epsom Downs Branch railway line. It was built in the late 1960s to replace a number of prefabricated buildings, purpose-built after the second World War.

The estate consists of 424 deck-access flats and maisonettes built to a then-innovative layout and a few terraced houses. The southern part of the site is a large public open space known as Belmont Park.

References

Housing estates in the London Borough of Sutton